Roger Munier (21 December 1923, Nancy – 10 August 2010, Vesoul) was a French writer and translator. From 1953, Munier was one of the first to translate into French the work of his master and friend, the German philosopher Martin Heidegger (1889–1976).

Bibliography 
Partial list of works and translations, chronologically:

Principal works 
 1963: Contre l'image, Éditions Gallimard, coll. «Le Chemin» ; éd. revue 1989
 1970: Le Seul (suivi de) D'un seul tenant, ; rééd. Deyrolle, 1993.
 1973: L'Instant, Gallimard, coll. «Voix ouvertes»  accessdate= 11/10/2016 read online
 1977: Le Contour, l'éclat,  coll. «Différenciation»
 1979: Le Parcours oblique, La Différence, coll. «Différenciation», n°5
 1979: Passé sous silence, Parisod, coll. «Strates»,n°2
 1980: Terre sainte,  
 1982: L'Ordre du jour, 
 1982: Le Moins du monde, Gallimard
 1982: Mélancolie, Le Nyctalope
 1983: Le Visiteur qui jamais ne vient, Lettres vives, coll. «La Nouvelle gnose», n°3
 1983: Terre ardente, éd. Deyrolle 
 1985: Au demeurant, La Feugraie, coll. «L'Allure du chemin» 
 1986: Eurydice : élégie, Lettres vives, coll. «Entre 4 yeux» 
 1988: Éden, Arfuyen
 1989: Le Jardin, éd. La Pionnière
 1989: Requiem, Arfuyen
 1991: Le Chant second, Deyrolle
 1991: L'Apparence et l'apparition, Deyrolle
 1992: Stèle pour Heidegger, Arfuyen
 1992: Voir, Deyrolle
 1992: Psaume furtif, éd. Perpétuelles
 1992: Tous feux éteints, Lettres vives, coll. «Terre de poésie»
 1993: Exode, Arfuyen
 1993: L'Ardente patience d'Arthur Rimbaud, José Corti
 1993: L'Être et son poème : essai sur la poétique d'André Frénaud, Encre marine
 1994: Ici, éd. La Pionnière 
 1994: Orphée : cantate, Lettres vives
 1994: Si j'habite, Fata Morgana, coll. «Hermès»
 1995: Opus incertum I : carnets 1980-1981, Deyrolle
 1996: Dieu d'ombre, Arfuyen
 1996: Éternité, Fata Morgana, coll. «Hermès»
 1998: La Dimension d'inconnu, José Corti, coll. «En lisant en écrivant»
 1999: Sauf-conduit, Lettres vives, coll. «Terre de poésie»
 1999: Contre jour (suivi de) Du fragment, La Feugraie, coll. «L'Allure du chemin»
 2001: La Chose et le Nom [Opus incertum II, 1982-1983], Fata Morgana
 2002: Opus incertum [III] 1984-1986, Gallimard
 2003: L'Extase nue, Gallimard
 2004: Adam, Arfuyen
 2004: Nada, Fata Morgana
 2005: Le Su et l'Insu [Opus incertum IV, 1987-1989] , Gallimard
 2007: Les Eaux profondes (Opus incertum V, 1990-1993), Arfuyen
 2009: Pour un psaume, Arfuyen
 2010: L'Aube, Rehauts
 2010:  Esquisse du Paradis perdu, Arfuyen
 2012: Vision, Arfuyen

Translations

From German 
 1957: Martin Heidegger. Lettre sur l'humanisme, éd. Montaigne 
 1970: Angelius Silesius. L'Errant chérubinique [édition abrégée], éd. Planète, series "L'Expérience intérieure"
 1982: Heinrich von Kleist. Sur le théâtre de marionnettes, éd. Traversière
 1998: Reiner Maria Rilke. La Huitième élégie de Duino, Fata Morgana, series "Les Immémoriaux"

From Spanish 
 1965: Octavio Paz, L'Arc et la Lyre, Gallimard, series "Les Essais", n°119 
 1972: Octavio Paz, Courant alternatif, Gallimard, series "Les Essais", n°176 
 1976: Octavio Paz, Point de convergence : du romantisme à l'avant-garde, Gallimard, series "Les Essais", n°193
 1978: Antonio Porchia. Voix (followed by) Autres voix, Fayard, series "Documents spirituels"
 1980: Roberto Juarroz. Poésie verticale, Fayard, series "L'Espace intérieur"
 1984: Roberto Juarroz. Nouvelle poésie verticale, éd. Lettres vives
 1986: Roberto Juarroz. Quinze poèmes, éd. Unes
 1986: Antonio Porchia. Voix inédites, éd. Unes
 1987: Octavio Paz. Sor Juana Inès de la Cruz, Gallimard, series "Bibliothèque des idées"
 1990: Roberto Juarroz. Poésie verticale : 30 poèmes, éd. Unes
 1992: Roberto Juarroz. Treizième poésie verticale, José Corti, series "Ibériques"
 1998: Octavio Paz. Fernando Pessoa : l'inconnu personnel, Fata Morgana

From English 
 1978: Haïku, préf. by Yves Bonnefoy, Fayard ; reprint 2006, Le Seuil, under the title Haïkus

From ancient Greek 
 1991: Heraclitus. Les Fragments d'Héraclite, Fata Morgana, coll. «Les Immémoriaux»

About Roger Munier 
 
 .

External links 
  Official website
 
 

Writers from Nancy, France
1923 births
2010 deaths
20th-century French writers
German–French translators
20th-century French translators
Winners of the Prix Broquette-Gonin (literature)
20th-century French male writers
French male non-fiction writers